Menepetalum is a genus of shrubs and small trees in the family Celastraceae. The genus is  endemic to New Caledonia in the Pacific and contains four species. Its closest relative is Dinghoua from Australia.

List of species
 Menepetalum cassinoides 
 Menepetalum cathioides 
 Menepetalum salicifolium 
 Menepetalum schlechteri

References

Endemic flora of New Caledonia
Celastrales genera
Celastraceae